Blossom Toes were a British psychedelic pop band active between 1966 and 1970. Initially known as The Ingoes, they were renamed and signed to the Marmalade record label of manager Giorgio Gomelsky. The original line-up comprised Brian Godding (born 19 August 1945, Monmouth, South Wales) (guitar, vocals, keyboards), Jim Cregan (born James Cregan, 9 March 1946, Yeovil, Somerset) (guitar, vocals), Brian Belshaw (born 25 February 1944, Wigan, Lancashire) (bass, vocals), and Kevin Westlake (born Kevin Patrick Westlake, 5 March 1947, Dublin, Co Dublin, Ireland (drums).

The band's debut album, We Are Ever So Clean is a classic example of quintessentially English psychedelia. On release, it was presented in the UK music magazine Melody Maker as "Giorgio Gomelsky's Lonely Hearts Club Band". Although not a major commercial success, tracks such as "What On Earth" or "Look At Me, I'm You" have helped give the album something of a cult period status as it is unearthed by successive generations of 1960s retro fans. It was included in Record Collector'''s list of the "100 Greatest Psychedelic Records".If Only For A Moment saw the band taking a noticeably heavier and rockier direction, with Cregan and Godding's distinctive two-part guitar harmonies playing a prominent role. At this point Westlake left, and was replaced by John "Poli" Palmer, and then Barry Reeves.

The band quit in 1970. Belshaw and Godding rejoined Westlake in B.B. Blunder, Cregan formed Stud with John Wilson and Charlie McCracken, before joining Family, as did Palmer.

The Blossom Toes contributed music to La Collectionneuse (1967), a film by French director Éric Rohmer, and also appeared in  "Popdown" (1967) by Fred Marshall.

Discography

Albums
 We Are Ever So Clean (Album - October 1967, Marmalade 607001 (mono) 608001 (stereo); re-releases include: 2007 Sunbeam Records CD SBRCD5035; 2022 Esoteric Recordings w/ much additional material)
 If Only for a Moment (Album - July 1969, Marmalade 608010; re-releases include: 2007 Sunbeam Records CD SBRCD5036 ; 2022 Esoteric Recordings)

Live album
 Love Bomb - Live 1967-69 (Live album - 2009,  Sunbeam Records 2CD SBR2CD5049, 3LP SBR3LP5049)

Compilations
 Collection (1988, Decal/Charly TCLIKD 43)
 What on Earth: Rarities 1967-69 (2009, Sunbeam Records CD SBRCD5071)

As THE INGOES:
 Before We Were Blossom Toes'' (2010, Sunbeam Records)

Singles
 "What on Earth" / "Mrs. Murphy's Budgerigar" / "Look at Me I'm You" (October 1967, Marmalade 598002 EP)
 "I'll Be Your Baby Tonight" (Bob Dylan) b/w "Love Is" (March 1968, Marmalade 598009)
 "Postcard" / "Everybody's Leaving Me Now" (October 1968, Marmalade 598012)
 "Peace Loving Man" / "Just Above My Hobby Horse's Head" (April 1969, Marmalade 598014)
 "New Day" (signaled on the SBRCD5036 Sunbeam Records CD as "unreleased 45 A-side") b/w "Love Bomb" (October 1969, Marmalade 598022)

References

External links
Blossom Toes Biography
Brian Godding Official Website

Sunbeam Records Reissues
Historien om klubb Filips del 1. (The history of club Filips pt. 1)
Historien om klubb Filips del 2. (The history of club Filips pt. 2)

British pop music groups
Psychedelic pop music groups
Musical groups established in 1967
1967 establishments in England